The Yucatecan languages are a branch of the Mayan family of Mexico, Belize, and Guatemala.

Languages

The Mayan languages in the Yucatecan branch are:
Mopan–Itza: Itzaʼ, Mopan
Yucatec–Lacandon: Maya (Yukatek), Lakantun (Lacandon)

All the Yucatecan languages are closely linked with each other.

See also
 Mesoamerican Linguistic Area
 Itza people

External links
 Itzaʼ language resources at Native-languages.org

Mayan languages